K171 or K-171''' may refer to:

Soviet submarine K-171
K-171 (Kansas highway), state highway in Kansas
K-171 (1958–2010 Kansas highway), former state highway in Kansas